Wilmont is an unincorporated community in New Castle County, Delaware, United States. Wilmont is located southwest of the intersection of Silverside Road and Shipley Road, east of Talleyville.

References 

Unincorporated communities in New Castle County, Delaware
Unincorporated communities in Delaware